{{safesubst:#invoke:RfD||2=Oiled (road)|month = February
|day =  9
|year = 2023
|time = 18:58
|timestamp = 20230209185800

|content=
REDIRECT Asphalt concrete

}}